Anthony Montrel Hilliard (born June 28, 1986) is an American professional basketball player for Malvín of the Liga Uruguaya de Básquetbol.

College career
Hilliard played four years of college basketball for the Elizabeth City State Vikings between 2005 and 2009, where he was named the CIAA Player of the Year in 2008 and 2009.

Professional career
Hilliard played his first two professional seasons in Belgium for Verviers-Pepinster (2009–10) and Okapi Aalstar (2010–11). In 2011–12, he played in Germany for the Artland Dragons. Between 2012 and 2014, he played in France for Antibes Sharks. He then played in Finland for Bisons Loimaa in 2014–15 and in Belarus for Tsmoki-Minsk in 2015–16. He won a championship in 2016 in the Belarus Premier League.

Hilliard started the 2016–17 season in Israel for Maccabi Rishon LeZion before joining Enisey in January 2017. He continued with Enisey for the 2017–18 season. He returned to France for the 2018–19 season to play for Le Portel.

On August 27, 2019, Hilliard has signed with Champville SC in the Lebanese Basketball League. In January 2020, he moved to Portugal to play for Benfica.

In February 2021, Hilliard returned to Finland to play out the 2020–21 season with Kauhajoki Karhu. For the 2021–22 season, he played for Malvín in Uruguay.

On May 20, 2022, Hilliard signed with the Taranaki Airs for the rest of the 2022 New Zealand NBL season. In 15 games, he averaged 26.3 points, 5.9 rebounds and 3.6 assists per game.

Hilliard returned to Malvín in Uruguay for the 2022–23 season. He is set to return to the Taranaki Airs for the 2023 New Zealand NBL season.

References

External links
FIBA profile
Basketball Champions League profile
BC Enisey profile

1986 births
Living people
African-American basketball players
American expatriate basketball people in Belarus
American expatriate basketball people in Belgium
American expatriate basketball people in Finland
American expatriate basketball people in France
American expatriate basketball people in Germany
American expatriate basketball people in Israel
American expatriate basketball people in New Zealand
American expatriate basketball people in Russia
American expatriate basketball people in Uruguay
American men's basketball players
Artland Dragons players
Basketball players from North Carolina
BC Enisey players
BC Tsmoki-Minsk players
Bisons Loimaa players
Elizabeth City State Vikings basketball players
ESSM Le Portel players
Maccabi Rishon LeZion basketball players
Okapi Aalstar players
Olympique Antibes basketball players
RBC Pepinster players
Shooting guards
S.L. Benfica basketball players
Small forwards
Sportspeople from Fayetteville, North Carolina
Taranaki Airs players
21st-century African-American sportspeople
20th-century African-American people